Lismire is a village in the north west of County Cork, Ireland.  The local Roman Catholic church is dedicated to St. Joseph and is in the parish of Kanturk (Cloyne Diocese). Lismire GAA, the local GAA club, have a number of titles to their name. Lismire is within the Dáil constituency of Cork North-West.

See also
 List of towns and villages in Ireland

References

Towns and villages in County Cork